Perfect Friday is a British bank heist film released in 1970, directed by Peter Hall. It stars Ursula Andress as Lady Britt Dorset, Stanley Baker as Mr Graham, David Warner as Lord Nicholas Dorset and T. P. McKenna as Smith.

Plot
Mr. Graham, an assistant bank manager who works in the West End of London, is dissatisfied with his boring life.

He meets Lady Britt Dorset, a spendthrift aristocrat. They devise a plan, along with her husband, Lord Nicholas Dorset, to steal £300,000 from the bank.

Their plan is to be enacted on the day that the manager plays golf. It involves Lord Dorset, posing as a bank inspector, substituting counterfeit money for real money which he places in Britt's deposit box.

The scheme almost fails when a real inspector arrives, but a second opportunity arises, and Lady Dorset absconds with the funds.

She fails to show up for the scheduled division of the loot, however, and Graham and Lord Dorset realize that they have been double crossed. Undaunted, they begin to plan another robbery for the following year.

Cast

 Stanley Baker as Mr. Graham 
 Ursula Andress as Lady Britt Dorset 
 David Warner as Lord Nicholas "Nick" Dorset 
 Patience Collier as Nanny 
 T. P. McKenna as Smith 
 David Waller as Williams 
 Joan Benham as Miss Welsh 
 Julian Orchard as Thompson 
 Trisha Mortimer as Janet 
 Anne Tirard as Miss Marsh 
 Johnny Briggs as Taxi Driver 
 Fred Griffiths as Taxi Driver
 Sidney Jennings as Taxi Driver
 Hugh Halliday as Cyclist
 Max Faulkner as Strong Room Guard   
 Carleton Hobbs as Elderly Peer 
 Eric Longworth as House of Lords Messenger
 Brian Peck as Chauffeur  
 Howard Lang as Bank Commissionaire 
 Patrick Jordan as Bank Guard
 Malcolm Johns as Swiss Boy Friend
 Garfield Morgan as 1st Airport Official
 Derek Cox as 2nd Airport Official 
 Barbara Ogilvie as Woman Airport Official 
 Georgina Simpson as Stewardess

Production
Dimitri de Grunwald had set up a new production and distribution consortium, the International Film Consortium, a co op of independent film distributors throughout the world. They raised finance for a series of films produced by London Screenplays Ltd - The McMasters, Perfect Friday, The Virgin and the Gypsy, The Last Grenade, and Connecting Rooms. De Grunwald described Perfect Friday'''s commercial prospects as "safe-ish".

The movie was produced by Stanley Baker who later said of it:
I think he [Peter Hall] will produce film work as interesting as what he's done on the stage... What I like about Perfect Friday is that everybody lies to each other and everybody believes each other's lies. I don't know if the audience realises it, but every time the characters speak to each other, they're lying.
Director Peter Hall said the sex scenes "were meant to make fun of all those sex films that steam up the West End."

Release
Gene Siskel called the film "special entertainment." The New York Times'' said "Mr. Hall has made an intelligent and quietly funny film about three eccentrics, who are as attractively written as they are played."

References

External links

 
Perfect Friday at TCMDB

1970 films
1970 comedy films
1970s crime comedy films
1970s heist films
British crime comedy films
British heist films
Films about bank robbery
Films directed by Peter Hall
Films set in England
Films set in London
Films shot at Pinewood Studios
Films scored by John Dankworth
1970s English-language films
Films based on television plays
1970s British films